Nassim Islam Al Bernaoui (born 5 April 1977) is an Algerian fencer. He competed in the individual and team sabre events at the 2004 Summer Olympics.

References

External links
 

1977 births
Living people
People from Algiers
Algerian male sabre fencers
Olympic fencers of Algeria
Fencers at the 2004 Summer Olympics
21st-century Algerian people